On 29 May 2021, a Cessna 501 Citation I/SP crashed into the Percy Priest Lake in Tennessee. All seven occupants died, including diet guru Gwen Shamblin Lara and her husband, actor Joe Lara. The cause of the accident is under investigation by the National Transportation Safety Board (NTSB).

Accident 
The aircraft, a 1982 model, took off from Smyrna Airport in Smyrna, Tennessee, at 10:50 a.m. for a planned Federal Aviation Regulations Part 91 personal flight to Palm Beach International Airport.

Aftermath 
By 1 June 2021, searchers had recovered both aircraft engines, a significant portion of the fuselage, and unidentified human remains. Authorities had named the seven victims, all of whom were leaders at the Remnant Fellowship Church.  While it initially remained unclear who was flying the aircraft when it crashed, Joe Lara and another victim were pilots, but according to pilot certification records examined by USA Today, the other man lacked the required type rating to fly the jet.
Aviation International News said that Lara had a valid medical certificate and that both pilots had multi-engine and instrument ratings. While the National Transportation Safety Board (NTSB) has not released the pilot's name during the ongoing investigation, its preliminary report stated "The pilot held a commercial pilot certificate with ratings for airplane single-engine land, multiengine land, and instrument airplane", "The pilot held a type rating for the airplane with no restrictions. His most recent Federal Aviation Administration (FAA) second-class medical certificate was issued on November 12, 2019, with the limitation that he 'must wear corrective lenses'" and "The pilot, who was among the seven killed, had a commercial pilot certificate and a private pilot certificate and had logged 1,680 total flight hours, 83 of those in the plane involved in the crash". This has led some reports to deduce the pilot could only have been Lara.

References

Aviation accidents and incidents in the United States in 2021
Aviation accidents and incidents in Tennessee
Accidents and incidents involving the Cessna Citation family
2021 in Tennessee
May 2021 events in the United States
Smyrna, Tennessee